is a station on the Yurikamome Line in Minato, Tokyo, Japan. It is numbered "U-03".

Station layout
The station has two elevated side platforms. This is the only station of the line that has two side platforms, as all the others stations have one (or two) island platforms.

Platforms

History
The station opened on 1 November 1995.

See also
List of railway stations in Japan

References

External links

Official information site

Railway stations in Tokyo
Yurikamome
Railway stations in Japan opened in 1995